Rene Ortiz (born April 23, 1969 in Anaheim, California) is a retired Mexican-American soccer player.  He spent most of his playing career in indoor soccer with two seasons in the Western Soccer Alliance and one season in Major League Soccer.  He currently coaches the Mexican national futsal team and the Hilltop High School soccer teams.

Player

Professional
Although born in the United States, Ortiz was raised in Tijuana, Mexico.  While in Mexico, he played for several youth clubs including Tecolatlan of the Major League of Tijuana.  In 1985, he played for Atletico Tijuana in the Mexican Third Division.  He returned to the United States as a teenager and attended Southwest Senior High School in San Diego, California for one year.  He played one season of high school soccer in 1987, scoring at such a high rate that the San Diego Sockers drafted him selected him in the 1987 Major Indoor Soccer League draft.  He played three indoor winter seasons with the Sockers, winning the three consecutive championships.  In the summer of 1988 and 1989, he played for the San Diego Nomads of the outdoor Western Soccer Alliance, winning the 1989 WSA championship.  In 1990, he moved to the Milwaukee Wave in the National Professional Soccer League.  In 1993, the Sockers moved to a new league, the Continental Indoor Soccer League which played a summer indoor schedule.  At the end of the 1992–1993 NPSL season, Ortiz signed with the Sockers for the 1993 CISL season, returning to the Wave for the 1993–1994 NPSL season.  Ortiz returned to the Sockers for the 1994 and 1995 seasons.

In February 1996, the Dallas Burn selected Ortiz in the seventh round (63rd overall) in the 1996 MLS Inaugural Player Draft.   In the fall of 1996, he was loaned for the winter to the Cincinnati Silverbacks of the NPSL where he sustained a serious knee injury.  In the summer of 1997, he played for the Monterrey La Raza in the CISL.  The CISL collapsed at the end of the season and Ortiz moved to the Arizona Thunder of the World Indoor Soccer League.  He retired when the Thunder folded in 2000.

National team
In 1995, Ortiz earned five caps, scoring one goal, with the United States national futsal team as the team took fourth place at the Futsal Mundialito.  In 1996, he played for the United States national beach soccer team which finished fourth at the Beach Soccer World Cup 1996.

Coach

Through his extensive playing career, Ortiz managed to establish his coaching career.  In 1992, he began his coaching career with the Germantown High School soccer team in Germantown, Wisconsin.  In 1994 and 1995, he was an assistant coach with Southwest Senior High School in San Diego, California.  In 1995, he became a staff coach with the Bonita Rebels youth soccer club in Bonita, California.  He remained on the Bonita Rebels staff for ten years.  From 1998 to 2000, he was an assistant coach at El Cajon Valley High School.  In 2001, he moved to the Marian Catholic High School in San Diego, California, a position he held until 2003.  In 2002, he coached the Mexican Futsal Team.  He was head coach of the Express Diesel, a Mexican indoor soccer team in Baja.  In 2006, he became the head coach of the Mexican national futsal team, a position he holds today.  He is also the head coach of the Hilltop High School boys and girls soccer teams.

Ortiz gained his bachelor's degree from San Diego State University in 2006.

References

External links
Ortiz Still Passionate About Soccer
Federacion Nacional de Futbol Rapido, A.C.: Rene Ortiz
NASL/MISL stats

1969 births
Living people
American men's futsal players
American soccer coaches
American soccer players
Arizona Thunder players
Cincinnati Silverbacks players
Continental Indoor Soccer League players
FC Dallas players
American people of Mexican descent
Major Indoor Soccer League (1978–1992) players
Major League Soccer players
Milwaukee Wave players
Monterrey La Raza players
National Professional Soccer League (1984–2001) players
Soccer players from Anaheim, California
Nomads Soccer Club players
San Diego Sockers (CISL) players
San Diego Sockers (original MISL) players
San Diego State University alumni
Western Soccer Alliance players
World Indoor Soccer League players
Association football midfielders
American beach soccer players